Erik Holmey (born 25 February 1942) is a Danish actor of the stage and screen with a tall, rugged, handsome presence, often seen as dangerous, high-ranking sidekicks.

He made his screen debut in Erik Balling's comedy Takt og tone i himmelsengen (1972), and reached an international audience as a regular in Dino De Laurentiis' series of Robert E. Howard-films, starting with John Milius' Conan the Barbarian (1982), where his many roles include the Turanian War Officer who is asked "What is best in life?", and replies: "The open steppe, fleet horse, falcons at your wrist, and the wind in your hair!"

Erik Holmey's starring roles include the vampire lord Rico Mortiz in Shaky González's action-horror film Nattens engel (1998), playing opposite Ulrich Thomsen and Mads Mikkelsen. This was the first of his frequent appearances in the films of director Shaky Gonzalez, followed by such roles as The Devil in the horror comedy One Hell of a Christmas (2002), crime lord Frank Lowies in the urban western Pistoleros (2007) and seasoned police negotiator Frank Toft in the upcoming heist movie Det grå guld (2010).

Holmey's stage career includes a season as actor at the Royal Danish Theatre in 1973-1974, as well as roles at Det ny Teater. He has worked as a dancer at Joker-Teatret, at Det Danske Balletakademi and on TV.

In 1979 and 1980 Erik Holmey won the Danish middleweight bodybuilding championship, and in 1981 he became Danish heavyweight bodybuilding champion.

Filmography

References

External links

1942 births
Danish male film actors
Living people